The Smelt family was a family from Yorkshire. It owned many of the burgages in Northallerton and was prominent in the town from the mid 17th century onwards.

Members
Leonard Smelt; married Grace Frankland, by whom he had issue:
Leonard Smelt (1683-1740), English MP; married Elizabeth Whitaker
William Smelt (1690-1755), English MP; married Dorothy Cayley, by whom he had issue:
Leonard Smelt (1719-1800), Royal Engineers officer, sub-governor to the sons of George III
Cornelius Smelt
Cornelius Smelt (1748-1832), Lieutenant Governor of the Isle of Mann
William Smelt (1788-1858), British Army officer

Sources
http://www.historyofparliamentonline.org/volume/1690-1715/member/smelt-leonard-1683-1740
http://www.historyofparliamentonline.org/volume/1715-1754/member/smelt-william-1690-1755

English families